Ammobatoidini is a tribe of cuckoo bees in the family Apidae. There are at least 4 genera and 30 described species in Ammobatoidini.

Genera
 Aethammobates Baker, 1994
 Ammobatoides Radoszkowski, 1867
 Holcopasites Ashmead, 1899
 Schmiedeknechtia Friese, 1896

References

Further reading

 
 
 

Nomadinae